Tomasz Zahorski (born 22 November 1984) is a former Polish footballer.

Club career 
Born in Barczewo, Zahorski began his career playing for local club Pisa Barczewo, from where he moved to OKS 1945 Olsztyn. Later, he played for Tecza Biskupiec and again for Pisa. In the 2004–05 season, he moved to OKS 1945 Olsztyn, where he played for until autumn 2005. In the spring of the 2005–06 season, he began playing in the Orange Ekstraklasa for Dyskobolia Grodzisk Wielkopolski. There he made his debut on in the Ekstraklasa on 4 March against Wisła Kraków, in which Groclin lost 2–1, while Zahorski scored in the 85th minute. In the 2006–2007 spring season, he was loaned to Górnik Łęczna. From there, he moved to Górnik Zabrze. Since joining, he has played for them in over 60 matches, where he has scored 16 goals. In the Polish Cup, he has played in 7 matches scoring 9 goals. Whilst he has played 8 times in the League Cup scoring four goals.

Górnik Zabrze 
On 14 June 2007 Zahorski signed a contract with Górnik Zabrze. The club spent 800,000 zloty on acquiring him. He was called up to the Poland National Football Team by Leo Beenhakker. After earning a few caps for the international team, Zahorski began to score more goals regularly in the Orange Ekstraklasa. At the end of the 2007–08 season, he scored 10 goals. During the Silesian Derby on 2 March 2008 Zahorski scored a goal. After four and a half years, Zahorski left Zabrze, to move to German 2. Bundesliga club MSV Duisburg.

Achievements 
2006/07 - Polish Cup (Groclin Grodzisk Wielkopolski)
2006/07 - Polish League Cup (Groclin Grodzisk Wielkopolski)

Poland Goals

References

External links
 
 National team stats on pzpn.pl 

1984 births
Living people
Sportspeople from Warmian-Masurian Voivodeship
People from Olsztyn County
Polish footballers
Polish expatriate footballers
Poland international footballers
Ekstraklasa players
OKS Stomil Olsztyn players
Dyskobolia Grodzisk Wielkopolski players
Górnik Łęczna players
Górnik Zabrze players
MSV Duisburg players
Jagiellonia Białystok players
San Antonio Scorpions players
Charlotte Independence players
GKS Katowice players
Expatriate footballers in Germany
Expatriate soccer players in the United States
Bundesliga players
North American Soccer League players
USL Championship players
UEFA Euro 2008 players
Association football forwards